"The Ungoverned" is a 1985 science fiction novella by American writer Vernor Vinge, set between his novels The Peace War and Marooned in Realtime. It was first published in Far Frontiers, Volume III, first collected in True Names and Other Dangers, and later published in the 1991 edition of the omnibus Across Realtime (Baen Books, 1991). The novella is a direct exploration of the concept of privately funded decentralized defense in the absence of a State, as described by Gustave de Molinari in "The Production of Security".

Plot summary 
The framework is the story of the Republic of New Mexico (NMR) invading the peaceful anarcho-capitalist society in Kansas. The NMR creates a military fiasco by completely failing to understand the cultural differences — including the amount of self-protection a lone Kansas farmer may have.

The protagonist is Wil W. Brierson, a detective/insurance agent, who attempts to disrupt the invasion while trying to minimize the property damage (and thus claims his company might have to pay out) and bridge the cultural gap.  Brierson is also the protagonist of Marooned in Realtime.

See also 

 Anarcho-capitalist literature

External links
 The full text of The Ungoverned is available online as part of the Baen Books collection Freedom!, edited by Mark Tier & Martin H. Greenberg.

1985 science fiction novels
Novels by Vernor Vinge
Anarchist fiction
American novellas